This is a list of works by Diego Rivera (8 December 1886, Guanajuato – 24 November 1957, Mexico City). He was a Modern painter, famous for his social realist murals. This list is split into two distinct era's in Rivera's work, the formative years between 1886 until 1920; and the social realism years between 1921 until his death in 1957.

Rivera is also known for his marriage to Frida Kahlo (6 July 1907, Mexico City – 13 July 1954, Mexico City), also a celebrated Mexican painter.

Paintings By Rivera

1886–1912 Formative years

1912–1913 Pre-cubism

1913–1920 Cubism

1917-1918 Realism

1921–1957 Social Realism

References 

Lists of paintings